Meioceras is a genus of minute sea snails, marine gastropod mollusks or micromollusks in the family Caecidae.

Species
Species  within the genus Meioceras include:
 Meioceras cornucopiae Carpenter, 1858
 Meioceras cubitatum Folin, 1868
 † Meioceras mateldae Selli, 1974 
 Meioceras nitidum (Stimpson, 1851)
 Meioceras tumidissimum de Folin, 1869
 Species brought into synonymy
 Meioceras bermudezi Pilsbry & Aguayo, 1934: synonym of Meioceras cornucopiae Carpenter, 1859
 Meioceras bitumidum de Folin, 1869: synonym of Meioceras nitidum (Stimpson, 1851)
 Meioceras boucheti Pizzini & Raines, 2011: synonym of Mauroceras boucheti (Pizzini & Raines, 2011) (original combination)
 Meioceras carpenteri de Folin, 1869: synonym of Meioceras nitidum (Stimpson, 1851)
 Meioceras cingulatum Dall, 1892: synonym of Meioceras nitidum (Stimpson, 1851)
 Meioceras constrictum Pilsbry & Aguayo, 1933: synonym of Meioceras cornucopiae Carpenter, 1859
 Meioceras contractum de Folin, 1874: synonym of Meioceras nitidum (Stimpson, 1851)
 Meioceras cornubovis Carpenter, 1859: synonym of Meioceras cornucopiae Carpenter, 1859
 Meioceras coxi de Folin, 1869: synonym of Meioceras nitidum (Stimpson, 1851)
 Meioceras crossei de Folin, 1869: synonym of Meioceras nitidum (Stimpson, 1851)
 Meioceras deshayesi de Folin, 1869: synonym of Meioceras nitidum (Stimpson, 1851)
 Meioceras fischeri de Folin, 1870: synonym of Meioceras nitidum (Stimpson, 1851)
 Meioceras imiklis de Folin, 1870: synonym of Meioceras nitidum (Stimpson, 1851)
 Meioceras kajiyamai Habe, 1963: synonym of Mauroceras kajiyamai (Habe, 1963) (original combination)
 Meioceras legumen (Hedley, 1899): synonym of Mauroceras legumen (Hedley, 1899)
 Meioceras leoni Bérillon, 1874: synonym of Meioceras nitidum (Stimpson, 1851)
 Meioceras mariae de Folin, 1881: synonym of Meioceras cornucopiae Carpenter, 1859
 Meioceras moreleti de Folin, 1869: synonym of Meioceras nitidum (Stimpson, 1851)
 Meioceras rhinoceros Pizzini, Raines & Vannozzi, 2013: synonym of Mauroceras rhinoceros (Pizzini, Raines & Vannozzi, 2013) (original combination)
 Meioceras sandwichense de Folin, 1881: synonym of Mauroceras sandwichense (de Folin, 1881) (original combination)
 Meioceras subinflexum de Folin, 1869: synonym of Meioceras nitidum (Stimpson, 1851)
 Meioceras tenerum de Folin, 1869: synonym of Meioceras cubitatum de Folin, 1868
 Meioceras undulosum de Folin, 1869: synonym of Meioceras nitidum (Stimpson, 1851)

References

External links
 Pizzini M., Raines B. & Vannozzi A. (2013) The family Caecidae in the South-West Pacific (Gastropoda: Rissooidea). Bollettino Malacologico, 49 (suppl. 10): 1-78

Caecidae